A vetocracy is a dysfunctional system of governance whereby no single entity can acquire enough power to make decisions and take effective charge. Coined by American political scientist Francis Fukuyama, the term points to an excessive ability or willingness to use the veto power within a government or institution (without an adequate means of any override). Such limitations may point to a lack of trust among members or hesitance to cede sovereignty.

Some institutions which have been hampered by perceptions of vetocratic limitations (and even responsible for their downfall) include the Polish–Lithuanian Commonwealth, the Confederate States of America,  and the League of Nations. The present-day United Nations Security Council has been criticized for its inability to take decisive action due to the exclusive rights of veto power of permanent members. Fukuyama has argued that the United States was facing such a crisis under the republic's first constitution, the Articles of Confederation. 

Fukuyama has raised the alarm that the U.S. seems to have a system of government at many levels with a detrimental number of vetos have caused lots of pain and suffering due to public sector dysfunction. This can lead to populism and authoritarianism as voters become frustrated with paralysis. 

For example, in the United States, a veto is not just held by the executive branch, but there are many other opportunities or veto points to derail a law throughout the political process. More veto points typically mean it's much more difficult to pass legislation.

United States 
The success rate of legislation in the U.S. in the modern era has dropped from ~7% to 2%, which could be due in part to partisanship making veto points more perilous for legislation.

Veto points for federal legislation in the United States 

 Representative to propose a bill
 House Committee chair(s)
 House Committee(s)
 Hastert Rule
 If the party in power decides to use it
 US House of Representatives
 Senate Committee chair(s)
 Senate Committee(s)
 Senate Filibuster
 Senate
 President
 note: can be overridden with 2/3 support
 Supreme Court
 Federalist Society for republican judicial nominees
 Lobbyists (professionals and otherwise)
 Corporate lobbying is roughly 4x greater than all other lobbying combined (34x that of public interest and labor lobbying)

Subnational governments 
Vetocracy has been used to describe many state and local governments in the United States where unusually high infrastructure and housing costs are in part blamed on the many veto points.

References

External links 
Why we can’t build
A few steps to overcome American 'vetocracy'
American Political Decay or Renewal?
Subscribe to read | Financial Times

Pejorative terms for forms of government
Veto